Sir Galahad of Twilight is a 1914 American silent short drama film directed by Sydney Ayres and written by Marie Layet. The film stars Perry Banks, Reaves Eason, William Garwood, Jack Richardson, Harry von Meter, and Vivian Rich.

Cast
Harry von Meter as Jacques Lennaux
Vivian Rich as Clotilde
Perry Banks as Louis Dorchet
Reaves Eason as Pedro
William Garwood as Dick
Jack Richardson as Jim

External links

1914 films
1914 drama films
Silent American drama films
American silent short films
American black-and-white films
1914 short films
Films directed by Sydney Ayres
1910s American films